The Swainson's crow (Euploea swainson) is a species of nymphalid butterfly in the Danainae subfamily. It is found in Indonesia and the Philippines.

References

Euploea
Taxonomy articles created by Polbot
Butterflies described in 1824